Staphylea, called bladdernuts, is a small genus of 10 or 11 species of flowering plants in the family Staphyleaceae, native to temperate regions of the Northern Hemisphere. The highest species diversity is in China, where four species occur.

They are large shrubs, occasionally small trees, growing to 2–5 m tall. The leaves are deciduous, arranged in opposite pairs, and pinnate, usually with three leaflets, but  S. pinnata and  S. colchica. The flowers are produced in drooping terminal panicles 5–10 cm long, with 5–15 flowers on each panicle; the individual flowers are about 1 cm long, with the five sepals and petals similar in size and in their white or pale pink colour. The fruit is an inflated papery two- or three-lobed capsule 3–10 cm long, containing a few small nut-like seeds.

Species
Plants of the World Online currently includes:
 Staphylea affinis (Merr. & L.M.Perry) Byng & Christenh.
 Staphylea arguta (Seem.) Byng & Christenh.
 Staphylea bolanderi A.Gray – Sierra bladdernut. Western North America.
 Staphylea bumalda DC. – Japanese bladdernut. Eastern Asia.
 Staphylea campanulata J.Wen
 Staphylea cochinchinensis (Lour.) Byng & Christenh. - Nepal to S. China and Indo-China.
 Staphylea colchica Steven – Colchis bladdernut, jonjoli. Eastern Europe.
 Staphylea emodi Wall. ex Brandis – Himalayan bladdernut. Himalaya.
 Staphylea formosana (Nakai) Byng & Christenh.
 Staphylea forrestii Balf.f. – China.
 Staphylea holocarpa Hemsl. – China.
 Staphylea indochinensis (Merr.) Byng & Christenh. - S. China, N. Vietnam
 Staphylea insignis (Tul.) Byng & Christenh.
 Staphylea japonica (Thunb.) Mabb.
 Staphylea macrosperma (C.C.Huang) Byng & Christenh.
 Staphylea megaphylla (Tul.) Byng & Christenh.
 Staphylea pinnata L. – European bladdernut. Europe.
 Staphylea pringlei S.Watson – Mexico.
 Staphylea shweliensis W.W.Sm. – China.
 Staphylea subsessilifolia (C.Y.Wu) Byng & Christenh.
 Staphylea ternata (Nakai) Byng & Christenh.
 Staphylea tricornuta (Lundell) Byng & Christenh.
 Staphylea trifolia L. – American bladdernut. Eastern North America.
 Staphylea yuanjiangensis K.M.Feng & T.Z.Hsu

Some botanists previously included the closely related genus Turpinia in Staphylea.

Cultivation and uses
Several species are grown as ornamental plants for their flowers and peculiar bladder-like fruit. The popular Staphylea × elegans is a hybrid of unknown origin, probably between S. colchica and S. pinnata. The pickled flowers can be served as a side dish in Georgian cuisine.

References

External links

EFloras: search results for Staphylea
Flora Europaea: Staphylea
Staphylea - at desert-tropicals.com
Staphylea trifolia images at bioimages.vanderbilt.edu

Rosid genera
Staphyleaceae